DokiDoki! PreCure is the tenth anime television series in Izumi Todo and Bandai's Pretty Cure franchise, produced by Asahi Broadcasting Corporation and Toei Animation. The series follows Mana Aida and her friends as they become legendary warriors known as the Pretty Cure in order to fight against the evil Jikochu, who attempt to manipulate the hearts of innocent people.

The original DokiDoki! Precure series aired in Japan between February 3, 2013, and January 26, 2014, replacing Smile PreCure!  in its initial timeslot, and was succeeded by HappinessCharge PreCure!.

The English-language localization Glitter Force: Doki Doki was produced originally under Saban Brands under its SCG Characters unit, and moved to Toei in June 2017. The series adapts the 49 Japanese episodes into 30 English episodes, with some content cut or combined across multiple episodes. Released as a Netflix Original Series outside of Japan, the first season was released on August 18, 2017, with the second season released on November 10, 2017. The theme song is "Glitter Force Doki Doki", performed by Blush, who also perform the insert songs before the closing credits that use footage of the girls in various computer animated dance sequences.



Episode list

DokiDoki! Precure (Japanese version)

Glitter Force Doki Doki (International Netflix/Toei Animation/Saban Brands version)

See also
DokiDoki! Precure the Movie: Mana's Getting Married!!? The Dress of Hope that Connects to the Future - An animated film based on the series.
Pretty Cure All Stars New Stage 2: Friends of the Heart - The fifth Pretty Cure All Stars crossover film which stars the DokiDoki Pretty Cures.

References

Pretty Cure episode lists